

Longhoughton Quarry is a Site of Special Scientific Interest (SSSI) in north Northumberland in North East England. The site is a now disused quarry which yielded whinstone, a hard dark rock associated in Northumberland with the Whin Sill.

Location and natural features
The quarry displays intrusions of the igneous rock dolerite beneath a Great Limestone stratum, and shows variously the incorporation of blocks of sedimentary rock; baking of sedimentary rock, and the delineation of ancient watercourses.

The condition of Longhoughton Quarry was judged to be favourable in 2009.

See also
List of Sites of Special Scientific Interest in Northumberland

References

External links
Natural England SSSI record for Longhoughton Quarry

Quarries in England
Sites of Special Scientific Interest in Northumberland
Sites of Special Scientific Interest notified in 1987
Quarry